Felicity is a female given name of English origin meaning "happiness". It is derived from the Latin word felicitas meaning "luck, good fortune". It is also used as a form of the Latin name Felicitas, taken from the name of the Ancient Roman goddess Fortuna. It was also the name of Saint Felicity of Rome, a 2nd-century saint venerated by the Roman Catholic Church. Felicia, a related name, is a feminine form of the name Felix, which is derived from an Ancient Roman cognomen meaning "lucky," or "successful." Its diminutive is Flick.

Felicity was the 236th most popular name for girls born in England and Wales in 2007. The name was the 706th most popular name for girls born in the United States in 2007, down from 619th place in 2006. The name was most popular in the United States in 1999, the year after the television show Felicity debuted. It was the 390th most popular name for girls in 1999, rising from 818th place in 1998, the year it debuted on the list of 1,000 most popular names for girls in the United States. Felicity Merriman is a red-headed Colonial doll produced by the American Girl company. The doll, which has a tie-in book series, movies, and a number of accessories, was introduced in the United States in 1991.

In other languages

Felicyta (Polish)
Felicidad, Felicitas, (Spanish)
Felistas  (Spanish)
Felicidade (Portuguese)
Felìcita (Italian)
Felicitász (Hungarian)
Felicitas (German)
Felicitat (Catalan)
Félicité, Félicie (French)
Felizitas (German)

People
 Felicity of Rome, 2nd-century Christian martyr and saint 
 Saint Felicity, early 3rd-century co-martyr of Saint Perpetua
 Felicity Abram (born 1986), Australian triathlete
 Felicity Aston (born 1977), British adventurer and climate scientist, first person to ski across Antarctica on her own power
 Felicity Cockram, Australian film producer
 Felicity Dahl (born 1938), British film producer
 Felicity Dowker (born 1980), Australian fiction writer, primarily in the horror genre
 Felicity Gallup (born 1969), British badminton player
 Felicity Galvez (born 1985), Australian swimmer and two-time Olympic champion
 Felicity Goodyear-Smith (born 1952), a medical doctor, academic, and public health advocate from New Zealand
 Felicity Huffman (born 1962), American actress
 Felicity Johnson (born 1971), Australian Paralympic tandem cyclist
 Felicity Jones (born 1983), English actress
 Felicity Kendal (born 1946), English actress
 Felicity LaFortune (born 1954), American actress
 Felicity Leydon-Davis (born 1994), New Zealand cricketer
 Felicity Lott (born 1947), English soprano
 Felicity Montagu (born 1960), English actress
 Felicity Okpete Ovai (born 1961), commissioner of the Rivers State Ministry of Works
 Felicity Palmer (born 1944), English mezzo-soprano and music professor
 Felicity Peake (1913-2002), founding director of the UK's Women's Royal Air Force
 Felicity Sheedy-Ryan (born 1985), Australian triathlete
 Felicity Urquhart (born 1976), Australian country music singer-songwriter
 Felicity Ward (born 1980), Australian comedian
 Felicity Wardlaw (born 1977), Australian road cyclist
 Felicity "Flick" Colby (1946–2011), American dancer
 Felicity "Flick" Rea (born c. 1937), English politician

Fictional characters 
 Felicity Hardy, a Marvel Comics character, also known as the third Scarlet Spider
 Felicity King, in the television series Road to Avonlea, played by Gema Zamprogna
 Felicity Merriman, from the American Girl series of dolls and books
 Felicity Porter, the main character in the television series Felicity, played by Keri Russell
 Felicity Scully, in the Australian soap opera Neighbours
 Felicity Shagwell, from the movie Austin Powers: The Spy Who Shagged Me, played by Heather Graham
 Felicity Smoak, a DC Comics character
 Felicity Smoak, a character from the television series Arrow, based on DC Comics, played by Emily Bett Rickards
 Felicity Wishes, the main character in the book series Felicity Wishes 
 Felicity Worthington, in Libba Bray's novel A Great and Terrible Beauty, as well as its two sequels
 Felicity (comics), a member of DC Comics' Omega Men, now known as Nebula
 Felicity, in The Dreamland Chronicles fantasy webcomic and comic book series
 Felicity, in 2009 comedy film The Boat That Rocked
 Felicity, in the novel Felidae
 Felicity Rivers, in Enid Blyton's book series Malory Towers
 Felicity Lemon, secretary to Hercule Poirot, fictional Belgian detective created by Dame Agatha Christie
 Felicity Parham, a background character in The Amazing World of Gumball.
 Felicity, a magical cat and the main character in Rainbow Butterfly Unicorn Kitty.

References

English feminine given names
Virtue names